Jacob Jeffery Bronkey (born September 18, 1965) is a former Major League Baseball pitcher who pitched with the Texas Rangers and Milwaukee Brewers. He attended Klamath Union High School in Klamath Falls, Oregon and became Player of the Year and won a state championship in 1983. 

He was drafted by the Philadelphia Phillies in 1983, but instead attended Oklahoma State University. He was drafted by the Minnesota Twins organization in 1986. After his career, he pursued a college degree in psychology and his daughter is a softball player at the University of Arkansas.

He is the only Major League player born in Afghanistan. He was born in Kabul to an American mother and Afghan father.

References

External links

1965 births
Living people
Afghan baseball players
Afghan people of American descent
Afghan emigrants to the United States
Beloit Snappers players
Kenosha Twins players
Major League Baseball pitchers
Major League Baseball players from Afghanistan
Milwaukee Brewers players
New Orleans Zephyrs players
Oklahoma City 89ers players
Orlando Twins players
Sportspeople from Kabul
Sportspeople of Afghan descent
Texas Rangers players
Tulsa Drillers players
Visalia Oaks players
Oklahoma State Cowboys baseball players